Kampong Batong is a village in the south-west of Brunei-Muara District, Brunei, about  from the capital Bandar Seri Begawan. It is one of the villages within Mukim Pengkalan Batu. The postcode is BH2923.

Geography 
As a village subdivision, Kampong Batong borders Kampong Katimahar and Kampong Kulapis to the north, Kampong Bebatik and Kampong Masin to the north-east, Kampong Parit to the east, Kampong Pengkalan Batu to the south-east, Kampong Panchor Murai to the south, and Kampong Maraburong and Kampong Kupang in Tutong District to the west.

Facilities 
Jefri Bolkiah Mosque is the village mosque; it was inaugurated by Sultan Hassanal Bolkiah on 26 July 2013. It can accommodate 1,000 worshippers.

References 

Batong